The Funk Model B was a 1930s American two-seat cabin monoplane designed by Howard and Joe Funk.  Originally built by the Akron Aircraft Company later renamed Funk Aircraft Company.

Development
The Model B was the first powered aircraft designed by brothers Howard and Joe Funk, whose previous experience was in homebuilt gliders and sailplanes. The Model B was a strut-braced high-wing monoplane with a conventional tail unit and fixed tailwheel landing gear. The design uses mixed construction with fabric-covered wooden wings and a welded steel-tube fuselage. The aircraft was powered by the brothers' own Model E engine developed from a Ford "B" motor-car engine. The prototype first flew in late 1933.

Production and operations
When the test flights proved to be successful the brothers formed the Akron Aircraft Company in 1939 to build the Funk B. After production began, the engine was changed to a 75 hp (56 kW) Lycoming GO-145-C2 horizontally-opposed four-cylinder engine and was re-designated the Model B-75-L.

In 1941 the company moved from Akron to Kansas and the company was renamed the Funk Aircraft Company. Production was stopped during the Second World War and one aircraft was impressed into service in 1942 with the United States Army Air Corps as the UC-92.

After the war in 1946 production was resumed using a Continental C85-12 engine and the aircraft was redesignated the Model B-85-C and named the Bee. It did not sell well and production was halted in 1948. 380 aircraft of all variants had been built.

Variants

Model B
Prototype and initial production aircraft with Funk E engine.
Model B-75-L
Pre-war production aircraft with a 75hp (56 kW) Avco Lycoming GO-145-C2 piston engine.
Model B-85-C Bee
Post-war production aircraft with a Continental C85-12 engine.
UC-92
Army designation for one impressed Model B-75-L (s/n 42-79548).

Specifications (B-85-C)

See also

References

Bibliography
 John Andrade, U.S. Military Aircraft Designations and Serials since 1909, Midland Counties Publications, 1979,  (Page 171)
 Bridgman, Leonard. Jane's All The World's Aircraft 1951–52. London: Sampson Low, Marston & Company, Ltd, 1951.
 Simpson, Rod, Airlife's World Aircraft, 2001, Airlife Publishing Ltd,  (Page 248)
 Simpson, Rod. The General Aviation Handbook. 2005. Midland Publishing. 
 The Illustrated Encyclopedia of Aircraft (Part Work 1982-1985), 1985, Orbis Publishing

External links

 "We Fly the Funkiest (did we actually say that) Classic Around," by Budd Davisson, November 1990, Air Progress

B
1930s United States sport aircraft
Single-engined tractor aircraft
High-wing aircraft
Aircraft first flown in 1933